Ingensia ingens is a species of sea snail, a marine gastropod mollusk in the family Muricidae, the murex snails or rock snails.

References

 Houart, R., 1987. Description of four new species of Muricidae (Mollusca : Gastropoda) from New Caledonia. Venus 46(4): 202–210

External links
 MNHN, Paris: holotype

Aspellinae
Gastropods described in 1987